Leo John Katalinas (February 5, 1914 – July 1977) was a player in the National Football League.

Career
Born in Shenandoah, Pennsylvania, Katalinas played with the Green Bay Packers during the 1938 NFL season. He played at the collegiate level at The Catholic University of America.

See also
List of Green Bay Packers players

References

1914 births
1977 deaths
People from Shenandoah, Pennsylvania
Green Bay Packers players
Catholic University Cardinals football players
Players of American football from Pennsylvania